NMSH can refer to:
 North Miami High School ("North Miami Senior High")
 North Mississippi State Hospital